Wellington Phoenix Football Club is a New Zealand professional association football club based in Wellington Central, Wellington. The club was formed in 2007 to be the second New Zealand member admitted into the A-League Men after the demise of New Zealand Knights. 

The list encompasses the honours won by Wellington Phoenix, records set by the club, their managers and their players. The player records section itemises the club's leading goalscorers and those who have made most appearances in first-team competitions. Attendance records at Wellington and WIN Stadium, their temporary home ground.

All figures current as of the match played on 2 January 2023.

Honours

Domestic
 A-League Pre-Season Challenge Cup
Runners-up (1): 2008

Player records

Appearances
 Most A-League Men appearances: Andrew Durante, 273
 Most Australia Cup appearances: Alex Rufer, 6
 Youngest first-team player: Ben Waine, 17 years, 57 days (against Bentleigh Greens, FFA Cup Round of 32, 7 August 2018)
 Oldest first-team player: Tony Warner, 37 years, 242 days (against Perth Glory, A-League, 8 January 2012)
 Most consecutive appearances: Chris Greenacre, 68 (from 22 January 2010 to 7 April 2012)

Most appearances
Competitive matches only, includes appearances as substitute. Numbers in brackets indicate goals scored. Current players are in bold.

a. Includes the A-League Pre-Season Challenge Cup and Australia Cup

Goalscorers
 Most goals in a season: Roy Krishna, 19 goals (in 2018–19 season)
 Most league goals in a season: Roy Krishna, 18 goals in the A-League, 2018–19
 Youngest goalscorer: Ben Waine, 18 years, 145 days (against Melbourne City, A-League, 3 November 2019)
 Oldest goalscorer: Eugene Dadi, 36 years, 205 days (against Sydney FC, A-League preliminary final, 13 March 2010)

Top goalscorers
Competitive matches only, includes appearances as substitute. Numbers in brackets indicate goals scored. Current players are in bold.

Managerial records

 First full-time manager: Ricki Herbert managed Wellington Phoenix from March 2007 to February 2013.
 Longest serving manager: Ricki Herbert –  (19 March 2007 to 25 February 2013)
 Shortest tenure as manage: Chris Greenacre – 2 months, 23 days (26 February 2013 to 19 May 2013)
 Highest win percentage: Ufuk Talay, 41.84%
 Lowest win percentage: Chris Greenacre, 16.67%

Club records

Matches

Firsts
 First match: Central Coast Mariners 2–0 Wellington Phoenix, A-League Pre-Season Challenge Cup, 14 July 2007
 First A-League Men match: Wellington Phoenix 2–2 Melbourne Victory, 26 August 2007
 First national cup match: Central Coast Mariners 2–0 Wellington Phoenix, A-League Pre-Season Challenge Cup, 14 July 2007

Record wins
 Record A-League Men win: 
 6–0 against Gold Coast United, A-League, 25 October 2009
 8–2 against Central Coast Mariners, A-League, 9 March 2019
 Record national cup win: 4–0 against Devonport City, Australia Cup Round of 32, 3 August 2022

Record defeats
 Record A-League Men defeat:
 1–7 against Sydney FC, A-League, 19 January 2013
 0–6 against Melbourne City, A-League, 2 April 2022
 Record national cup defeat: 1–5 against Melbourne City, FFA Cup Round of 16, 26 August 2015

Record consecutive results
 Record consecutive wins: 5, from 30 January 2010 to 7 March 2010
 Record consecutive defeats: 9, from 20 March 2016 to 31 October 2016
 Record consecutive matches without a defeat: 13, from 11 April 2021 to 27 November 2021
 Record consecutive matches without a win: 11, from 31 March 2013 to 19 December 2013
 Record consecutive matches without conceding a goal: 3, from 30 January 2010 to 12 February 2010
 Record consecutive matches without scoring a goal: 3
 from 4 January 2008 to 19 January 2008
 from 30 August 2008 to 21 September 2008
 from 29 March 2015 to 12 April 2015
 from 8 October 2016 to 23 October 2016
 from 27 January 2018 to 11 February 2018
 from 28 October 2018 to 9 November 2018

Goals
 Most league goals scored in a season: 46 in 27 matches, A-League, 2018–19
 Fewest league goals scored in a season: 23 in 21 matches, A-League, 2008–09
 Most league goals conceded in a season: 55 in 27 matches, A-League, 2017–18
 Fewest league goals conceded in a season: 29 in 27 matches, A-League, 2009–10

Points
 Most points in a season: 46 in 27 matches, A-League, 2014–15
 Fewest points in a season: 20 in 21 matches, A-League, 2007–08

Attendances
This section applies to attendances at Wellington, the club's present home since foundation and WIN Stadium, where Wellington Phoenix temporarily played their home matches from 2021 to 2022 due to COVID-19 pandemic troubles in Wellington.

 Highest attendance at Wellington: 32,792 against Newcastle Jets, A-League Men Finals, 7 March 2010
 Lowest attendance at Wellington: 3,060 against Melbourne Heart, A-League, 3 March 2013
 Highest attendance at WIN Stadium: 3,637 against Sydney FC, A-League, 2 January 2021
 Lowest attendance at WIN Stadium: 586 against Western United, A-League Men, 21 January 2022

References

External links
Official website

New Zealand football club records and statistics
Records and Statistics